Yevhen Neplyakh (born 11 May 1992) is a Ukrainian football defender who plays for Alians Lypova Dolyna.

Career
Neplaykh was the member of Ukrainian national under-18 football team. In March 2013 he was called up for Ukrainian national under-21 football team by coach Serhiy Kovalets.

References

External links 
 
 

1992 births
Living people
Footballers from Dnipro
Ukrainian footballers
FC Sevastopol players
FC Sevastopol-2 players
Association football midfielders
Ukrainian expatriate footballers
Super League Greece players
Expatriate footballers in Greece
Ukrainian expatriate sportspeople in Greece
FC Karpaty Lviv players
Platanias F.C. players
Ukrainian Premier League players
NK Veres Rivne players
FC Mariupol players
FC Volyn Lutsk players
FC Olimpik Donetsk players
FC Alians Lypova Dolyna players